Marguerite E. Bowman (May 9, 1918 – September 20, 1997) was a member of the Ohio House of Representatives.

References

External links
Profile on the Ohio Ladies' Gallery website

1918 births
1997 deaths
Members of the Ohio House of Representatives
Women state legislators in Ohio
20th-century American politicians
20th-century American women politicians